Kopachuck State Park is a publicly owned recreation area situated on Henderson Bay in Puget Sound, about  west of the city of Gig Harbor, Washington. The state park's  encompass over a mile of saltwater shoreline. The park provides sweeping views of sunsets, the Olympic Mountains and Puget Sound. Cutts Island, known locally as "Deadman's Island," which lies about a half-mile from the park shore, is reachable by boat. Both Kopachuck and Cutts Island are administered by the Washington State Parks and Recreation Commission.

History
The park bears a name whose origin derives from the language of the Chinook Tribe, a band of Pacific Coastal Indians. Kopachuck is a blend of two words:  "kopa" meaning "at" and "chuck" meaning "water." The Puyallup and Nisqually Indian Tribes used the area around the park for seasonal fishing and clam gatherings.

2009 proposed closure
Kopachuck was tagged for closure in 2009 by Washington Governor Chris Gregoire as part of budget cutbacks in the wake of hard economic times, prompting neighbors to rally to save the park.

Diseased trees
In 2011, it was found that many of the park's Douglas firs were diseased with laminated tree rot, one of the deadliest diseases a fir tree can contract. The campground was closed by park rangers soon after; the closure became permanent in 2014. In September 2011, many of the diseased trees were cut down due to increasingly urgent safety issues. In response, local artists created "Intertwined — Requiem for the Trees," which the artists said was to record the trees before their death. The piece was displayed in the Gig Harbor History Museum for a short time that fall.

Activities and amenities
Recreational activities include swimming and kayaking. The normally steep rocky beach becomes a level sandbar at low tide and is a popular place for kids to play in the sand. The park offers kitchen shelters, 16 sheltered and 76 unsheltered picnic tables, and two miles of hiking trails. The campground has been permanently closed.

References

External links

Kopachuck State Park Washington State Parks and Recreation Commission 
Kopachuck State Park Map Washington State Parks and Recreation Commission

Puget Sound
State parks of Washington (state)
Parks in Pierce County, Washington